Carenum regulare is a species of ground beetle in the subfamily Scaritinae. It was described by Sloane in 1900.

References

regulare
Beetles described in 1900